Bob Alan Estes (born February 2, 1966) is an American professional golfer who plays on the PGA Tour Champions. He was previously a member of the PGA Tour, where he was a four-time champion.

Early life and amateur career
Estes was born in Graham, Texas and raised in Abilene, Texas. He first played golf at age 4 and decided to become a professional golfer at age 12. Estes attended the University of Texas from 1984 to 1988 and was a member of the golf team. He won the 1988 Haskins Award for most outstanding collegiate golfer in the nation.

Professional career
Estes had four PGA Tour victories between 1994 and 2002, and he has been in the top 20 of the Official World Golf Ranking. He is particularly well known for his excellent short game. Estes follows a strict physical conditioning routine that includes weightlifting, agility exercises, diet and short-distance wind sprints. In addition, he has experimented with the 10-finger grip, which is rare in the modern game of golf.

In 2011, Estes was recovering from a wrist injury, but still managed to make 12 starts on the PGA Tour. Of the five cuts he made, one was a near-win at the Greenbrier Classic, where he lost in a playoff. Estes is 0–4 in PGA Tour playoffs. He still managed to finish 135th on the Tour's money list, but regained his Tour card through Q School and satisfied a medical extension.

After making the FedEx Cup in 2012, Estes only made two starts in 2013, missing the cut in Las Vegas and finishing T10 at Mayakoba. Estes had a medical exemption until July 2018. In 2016, he changed his focus to PGA Tour Champions.

Amateur wins
1985 Trans-Mississippi Amateur
1987 LaJet Amateur
1988 Texas State Amateur

Professional wins (4)

PGA Tour wins (4)

PGA Tour playoff record (0–4)

Results in major championships

CUT = missed the half-way cut
"T" = tied

Summary

Most consecutive cuts made – 7 (1998 Open Championship – 2000 Masters)
Longest streak of top-10s – 2 (1995 Open Championship – 1995 PGA)

Results in The Players Championship

CUT = missed the halfway cut
"T" indicates a tie for a place

Results in World Golf Championships

1Cancelled due to 9/11

QF, R16, R32, R64 = Round in which player lost in match play
"T" = Tied
NT = No tournament

Results in senior major championships

CUT = missed the halfway cut
"T" indicates a tie for a place
NT = No tournament due to COVID-19 pandemic

See also
1988 PGA Tour Qualifying School graduates
2011 PGA Tour Qualifying School graduates

References

External links

American male golfers
Texas Longhorns men's golfers
PGA Tour golfers
PGA Tour Champions golfers
Golfers from Austin, Texas
People from Graham, Texas
Sportspeople from Abilene, Texas
1966 births
Living people